Dongbinggo-dong is a dong, neighbourhood of Yongsan-gu in Seoul, South Korea. It is a legal dong (법정동 ) administered under its administrative dong (행정동 ), Seobinggo-dong

See also 
Administrative divisions of South Korea

References

External links
 Yongsan-gu official website (in English)
 Yongsan-gu official website

Neighbourhoods of Yongsan District